Okreek is an unincorporated community in Todd County, South Dakota, United States. As of the 2020 Census, the population was 190. The town is wholly within the jurisdiction of the Rosebud Indian Reservation, and the populace is almost entirely Sioux-American. Okreek consists primarily of two long blocks of inhabited tract housing, and has about 30 private telephone subscribers within town limits.  There is also an elementary school and a Post Office which has been assigned the ZIP Code of 57563.

The name Okreek is a corruption of Oak Creek, a stream near the town site.

Demographics

References

Unincorporated communities in Todd County, South Dakota
Unincorporated communities in South Dakota
Rosebud Indian Reservation